Liopilio is a genus of harvestmen in the family Phalangiidae.

Species
 Liopilio glaber Schenkel, 1951
 Liopilio yukon J. C. Cokendolpher, 1981

References

Harvestmen
Harvestman genera